Coan Baptist Church, also known as Wicomico Church, is a historic Southern Baptist church located near Heathsville, Northumberland County, Virginia.  The current building was built in 1846, and is a rectangular, two-story, gable-roofed, brick structure. It has Federal and Greek Revival style design elements.  Additions were made in 1957, 1975  and 2000.  The congregation was founded in 1804 as the Wicomico Church.

It was listed on the National Register of Historic Places in 1995.

References

External links
Coan Baptist Church website

19th-century Baptist churches in the United States
Baptist churches in Virginia
Churches on the National Register of Historic Places in Virginia
Greek Revival church buildings in Virginia
Churches completed in 1846
Churches in Northumberland County, Virginia
National Register of Historic Places in Northumberland County, Virginia
Southern Baptist Convention churches